Onanay (International title: The Way to Your Heart) is a Philippine television drama family series broadcast by GMA Network. Directed by Gina Alajar and Joel Lamangan, it stars Jo Berry in the title role. It premiered on August 6, 2018 on the network's Telebabad line up replacing Kambal, Karibal. The series concluded on March 15, 2019 with a total of 160 episodes. It was replaced by Sahaya in its timeslot.

The series is originally titled as Extraordinary Love. It is streaming online on YouTube.

Premise
Sisters Maila and Natalie have different approach to their mother, Onay who has Achondroplasia. Maila is a nice and attentive daughter, while Natalie is arrogant and disobedient. Besides their different upbringing, they have a different father as well.

Cast and characters

Lead cast
 Mikee Quintos as Maila M. Samonte
 Kate Valdez as Natalie Montenegro / Rosemary Montenegro
 Jo Berry as Ronalyn "Onay" Matayog-Samonte 
 Cherie Gil as Helena Sanchez-Montenegro 
 Nora Aunor as Cornelia "Nelia" Dimagiba-Matayog.

Supporting cast
 Wendell Ramos as Lucas Samonte 
 Rochelle Pangilinan as Sally del Mundo
 Vaness del Moral as Imelda Pascual 
 Enrico Cuenca as Oliver Pascual
 Gardo Versoza as Dante Dimagiba

Guest cast 
 Adrian Alandy as Elvin Sanchez Montenegro
 JC Tiuseco as Ronald
 Gilleth Sandico as Soleng
 Rein Adriano as young Maila
 Princess Aguilar as young Natalie / Rosemary
 Eunice Lagusad as Kiana
 Marina Benipayo as Agatha Ocampo
 James Teng as James
 Jenzel Angeles as Louise Ocampo
 Liezel Lopez as Wendy
 Ayeesha Cervantes as Danica
 Sofia Pablo as Gracie P. Samonte
 Marnie Lapus as Metring
 Arthur Solinap as Arthur
 Pekto as Hector
 Marco Alcaraz as Vincent "Vince" Delgado
 Neil Ryan Sese as Emmanuel "Emman" Cruz
 Kier Legaspi as Joel
 Janna Victoria as Madel Cruz 
 James Blanco as Mark
 Dominic Roco as Castro
 Shermaine Santiago as Marie Chu
 Angel Guardian as Chelsea
 Orlando Sol as Lando

Ratings
According to AGB Nielsen Philippines' Nationwide Urban Television Audience Measurement People in television homes, the pilot episode of Onanay earned an 11.6% rating.

Accolades

References

External links
 
 

2018 Philippine television series debuts
2019 Philippine television series endings
Filipino-language television shows
GMA Network drama series
Television shows set in the Philippines